Lisbunny may refer to:

Lisbunny, County Londonderry, a townland in County Londonderry, Northern Ireland
Lisbunny, County Tipperary, a townland and civil parish in County Tipperary, Ireland